Nagaichthys filipes is a species of spineless eel native to Indonesia and Malaysia.  This species grows to a length of  SL.  This species is the only known member of its genus.

References
 

Chaudhuriidae
Fish described in 1991